António Pedro dos Santos Simões (born 12 March 1975) is a global banking executive. He works at Banco Santander as the CEO of Santander Spain and the Regional Head of Europe, where is a member of the Group Management Committee and reports to the Group CEO.

Simões was at HSBC for 13 years where he led a number of businesses both in London and Hong Kong. He was previously a Partner at McKinsey and an Associate at Goldman Sachs.

Education 
António Simões was born in Lisbon in 1975. He graduated from Nova School of Business & Economics 
in Lisbon. He received several awards, including the award for top student in his graduating class.

He holds a Master’s degree in Business Administration (MBA) from Columbia University. During his studies he was a teaching assistant for managerial economics and capital markets. He graduated with honours and is a member of Beta Gamma Sigma honour society. In the fall of 2000, as part of the MBA programme, he spent a semester at the Bocconi University in Milan.

Simões attended the Global Leadership and Public Policy program at Harvard Kennedy School. The program is designed by Harvard's Kennedy School of Government and the World Economic Forum for Young Global Leaders.

Professional career

Early career 
In 1997, Simões joined McKinsey & Company as a business analyst in their Iberian office.

In 2000, he worked at Goldman Sachs in London, as an associate serving financial institutions in Investment Banking.

He returned to McKinsey as an associate in their London office where he was later elected a partner. During his career at McKinsey, he worked across several geographies serving mainly financial services client. His focus included Strategy and Risk Management, with contributions to McKinsey Quarterly and other publications.

Career with HSBC 
Simões joined HSBC in 2007 to lead Group Strategy and Mergers & Acquisitions activities reporting to Stephen Green, then Group Chairman of HSBC holdings.  In October 2009 he assumed responsibilities also for Planning, reporting to the Group CEO, Michael Geoghegan relocating to Hong Kong for two years.  In an interview to his Alma mater he said 'I took 58 long-haul flights in 2011 alone...I don't get the work life balance right all the time'. Simões was appointed a Group General Manager in 2011 and became also Chief of Staff to the Group CEO, Stuart Gulliver.

In January 2012, he relocated back to London and was appointed European head of Retail Banking and Wealth Management (RBWM), including responsibility for Asset Management and Insurance.

On 1 November 2012, he was appointed CEO of HSBC in the UK and deputy Chief Executive, of HSBC Bank plc, the Group's principal UK and continental European subsidiary.  He was a Director of HSBC Bank plc until September 2018 and was also a Director of the France (until September 2018) and Turkish subsidiary boards (until September 2014) of HSBC Bank plc.

On 1 September 2015, Simões was appointed the Chief Executive of HSBC Bank plc and Chief Executive of Europe, with responsibility for the UK and Continental Europe. When he assumed that position he also joined the Group Management Board, HSBC's Group Executive Committee.

In September 2018, HSBC announced the appointment of Simões as Chief Executive, Global Private Banking, with effect from 1 January 2019.

Career with Santander 
In May 2020, Banco Santander announced that Simões would join the bank on 1 September 2020 with managerial responsibility and oversight of the bank’s businesses in Europe with reporting lines from the country heads of Spain, UK, Portugal and Poland.

In April 2021, Banco Santander announced that he would become CEO of Santander Spain together with his existing responsibilities as Regional Head of Europe.

Simões is a member of the Group Management Committee and reports to the Group CEO, José Antonio Alvarez.

Commitments 
In 2009, he was appointed a Young Global Leader of the World Economic Forum and is a regular delegate at the annual meeting in Davos.

He is a vocal campaigner on youth unemployment issues and has been involved with the Prince’s Trust since 2012. He became a Trustee of Prince’s Trust International in 2018.

In 2012, he was invited to be a founding member of Conselho da Diáspora Portuguesa (World Portuguese Network), a group of Portuguese people living abroad advising the Portuguese presidency.

He was a member of the Practitioner Panel of the Financial Conduct Authority (FCA, conduct regulator for UK financial services industry) from July 2013 and was chair of the panel from August 2015 until August 2017. He was member of the Practitioner Panel of the Prudential Regulations Authority (PRA, prudential regulator for UK financial services industry) in November 2013.

Simões led a review of the UK financial services trade association in the UK on behalf of ten banking service providers.

In April 2015, he joined the Banking Standards Board, created to promote high ethical and behavioral standards in the Banking industry, as practitioner member.

He is a regular speaker in industry forums on the future of the financial services industry, including the impact of digital technologies in banking.

Personal life 

He has contributed to several books, including Lord Browne's The Glass Closet and Stephen Frost's The Inclusion Imperative. In January 2015 Simões came first at the Out at Work & Telegraph Top 50 LGBT Executives list, which celebrates individuals making a difference at the workplace. OUTstanding in Business together with the Financial Times nominated him as the most inspiring LGBT senior business executive in October 2013. As part of the European Diversity Awards 2013, he was also awarded the Diversity Champion of the Year.

He has been married since 2007 and lives between Madrid and London with his husband and two children.

References

External links 
 Symposium in Hong Kong with Antonio Simoes presented by the Weatherhead East Asian Institute at Columbia University on Sunday, May 22, 2011 
 Antonio Simoes on Diversity and Inclusion - HSBCNow coverage
 Unlocking Growth with Digital - Panel at WEF 2014 hosted by Accenture
 Martina Navratilova and Antonio Simoes on Coming Out and LGBT Rights - HSBC NOW
 Speaker at EUROut Conference at LBS - Twitter Coverage
 Guardian newspaper - HSBC’s António Simões says being gay was key to career success

Living people
1975 births
Portuguese bankers
Columbia Business School alumni
NOVA University Lisbon alumni
People from Lisbon
Portuguese gay men
Gay businessmen
Portuguese expatriates in the United Kingdom
21st-century Portuguese LGBT people